Paul Winter (February 6, 1906 – February 22, 1992) was a French athlete who competed mainly in the discus throw and also shotput. He was born in Ribeauvillé, Haut-Rhin.

He competed for a France in the 1932 Summer Olympics held in Los Angeles, California, in the discus throw where he won the bronze medal and also the 1936 Summer Olympics held in Berlin, Germany were he failed to qualify.

He also won four French championships in 1931,1933, 1935 and 1937.

References

Paul Winter's profile at Sports Reference.com

1906 births
1992 deaths
People from Ribeauvillé
French male discus throwers
Olympic bronze medalists for France
Athletes (track and field) at the 1932 Summer Olympics
Athletes (track and field) at the 1936 Summer Olympics
Olympic athletes of France
European Athletics Championships medalists
Medalists at the 1932 Summer Olympics
Olympic bronze medalists in athletics (track and field)
Sportspeople from Haut-Rhin
20th-century French people